Montfortula rugosa, common name the cap-shaped false limpet, is a species of keyhole limpet, a marine gastropod mollusc in the family Fissurellidae.

Description
The size of the shell varies between 9 mm and 25 mm.

Distribution
Montfortula rugosa, a marine species, is found off Australia (from West Australia to South Queensland), Tasmania and New Zealand.

References

 Mestayer, M. K. (1928). A note on Sigapatella terraenovae Peile. A new Montfortula. Transactions of the New Zealand Institute 59: 622–624.
 Powell A. W. B., New Zealand Mollusca, William Collins Publishers Ltd, Auckland, New Zealand 1979 
 McLean J.H. (2011) Reinstatement of the fissurellid subfamily Hemitominae, with the description of new genera, and proposed evolutionary lineage, based on morphological characters of shell and radula (Gastropoda: Vetigastropoda). Malacologia 54(1-2): 407-427
 Grove, S. 2011. The Seashells of Tasmania: A Comprehensive Guide. Taroona, Australia: Taroona Publications. [vi], 81.

External links
 Reeve, L. A. (1841-1842). Conchologia Systematica, or complete system of conchology; in which the Lepades and conchiferous Mollusca are described and classified according to their natural organization and habits. Longman, Brown, Green, & Longman's, London. Vol. 1
 Gould, A. A. (1846). Descriptions of new shells, collected by the United States Exploring Expedition. Proceedings of the Boston Society of Natural History. 2
 Gould, A. A. (1859). Descriptions of shells collected by the North Pacific Exploring Expedition. Proceedings of the Boston Society of Natural History. 7: 161-166.
 

Fissurellidae
Gastropods of Australia
Gastropods of New Zealand
Gastropods described in 1834